Life imprisonment in Slovakia (doživotný trest odňatia slobody in Slovak) is a sentence of indeterminate length, lasting until the convict's death. In Slovak law, since the abolishment of the death penalty in 1990, it is the most severe punishment available. After 25 years, the prisoner can apply to the prosecutor to be released on probation and at any time, he may apply to President of Slovakia for clemency.

As of 2007 there were 28 people serving a life sentence in Slovakia, all of them located in two high-security prisons in Ilava and Leopoldov. Two prisoners have committed suicide while serving their sentences and there were no amnesties or releases on probation in the history of Slovakia. The list of people convicted for life in Slovakia includes the serial killer Ondrej Rigo, mafia boss Mikuláš Černák or mafia hitman Alojz Kromka.

History 
The last person to be executed in Slovakia is Štefan Svitek who was hanged on June 8, 1989, in Bratislava, then Czechoslovakia. Svitek murdered his wife and two daughters with an axe on October 30, 1987. Since January 1990 a non-written moratorium on death penalty was in place in Czechoslovakia. Death sentence was abolished on July 1, 1990, with the newly created Slovak Republic taking over the law common in Czechoslovakia and the death sentence was never renewed.

Living conditions 
People sentenced to life imprisonment in Slovakia are assigned three and a half meters squared space in their cell, which includes a bed, table, wardrobe, radio and electric lighting. Outside of their cells, they are always accompanied by a prison guard. They can only work inside their cells or in workplaces inside the prison. They are not allowed physical contact with their relatives.

List of people sentenced to life imprisonment in Slovakia 
This is a list of people sentenced to life imprisonment in Slovakia after its creation on January 1, 1993. The list should be complete as of April 25, 2022.

Prisoners no longer serving their sentence

See also 
 Life imprisonment
 Prisons in Slovakia
 Crime in Slovakia
 Leopoldov Prison
 Slovak mafia

References 

Slovakia
Law of Slovakia